Wedekindellina is an extinct genus of fusulinid.

Species 
W. alveolata Stewart, 1992
W. fluxa Wilde, 2006
W. henbesti Skinner, 1931
W. plena Wilde, 2006
W. pseudohenbesti Wilde, 2006
W. rossi Wilde, 2006
W. similis Wilde, 2006
W. uralica Dutkevich, 1934

References 

Paleozoic life
Fusulinida